Kim Jung-eun (born March 4, 1974) is a South Korean actress best known for her roles in the film Marrying the Mafia (2002) and the television series Lovers in Paris (2004), I am Legend (2010) and Make a Woman Cry. In 2008, Kim hosted her own music talk show Kim Jung-eun's Chocolate on SBS.

Filmography

Television dramas

Films

Variety shows
 Family Register Mate (MBC, 2022) – Host 
Family Register Mate (MBC, 2021) – Host 
 Legend Music Class - Lalaland  (Channel A, 2021) – Cast
Something (SBS, 2014) -MC
Miracle Audition (SBS, 2011) – Judge
Kim Jung-eun's Chocolate (SBS, 2008–2011) – MC
TV Entertainment Tonight (SBS, 2001–2002) – MC

Web shows 
 Alive (TVING, 2022) – Host

Documentary narration
SBS Special: "Symphony of Dreams" (SBS, 2013)
MBC Special: 도시의 개 (MBC, 2010)
Wednesday Special: 금메달을 향해 뛰어라: 대륙의 올림픽 꿈나무들 (KBS1, 2008)

Radio
To You Who Forget the Night (KBS Happy FM, 1999–2000) – DJ

Discography
Sad Fate – Kim Jung-eun (Ohlala Couple OST, 2012)
In Heaven – JYJ, narration by Kim Jung-eun (2011)
Reminiscence – Kim Jung-eun (I Am Legend OST, 2010)
You (Duet ver.) – Kim Jung-eun & Lee Joon-hyuk (I Am Legend OST, 2010)
To You, Dear Music – Kim Jung-eun (I Am Legend OST, 2010)
Comeback Madonna Band

Awards

References

External links

  
 
 
 

South Korean film actresses
South Korean television actresses
Konkuk University alumni
Actresses from Seoul
1974 births
Living people
Best Actress Paeksang Arts Award (television) winners